The 1987–88 season was the 73rd season of the Isthmian League, which is an English football competition featuring semi-professional and amateur clubs from London, East and South East England. 

The league consisted of three divisions. Division Two was divided into two sections.

Yeovil Town were champions, winning their first Isthmian League title. At the end of the season Oxford City left the league after losing its ground. Walthamstow Avenue merged into Leytonstone/Ilford. New club regained Leytonstone/Ilford's name and place in the Premier Division. Before the start of the next season Haringey Borough resigned from the league.

Premier Division

The Premier Division consisted of 22 clubs, including 19 clubs from the previous season and three new clubs:
 Basingstoke Town, transferred from Southern Football League
 Leyton-Wingate, promoted as runners-up in Division One
 Leytonstone/Ilford, promoted as champions of Division One

At the end of the season Division One club Walthamstow Avenue merged into Leytonstone/Ilford. New club started next season under the name of the Premier Division club.

League table

Division One

Division One consisted of 22 clubs, including 16 clubs from the previous season and six new clubs:

Two clubs relegated from the Premier Division:
 Walthamstow Avenue
 Worthing

Two clubs promoted from Division Two North:
 Chesham United
 Wolverton Town

Two clubs promoted from Division Two South:
 Marlow
 Woking

At the end of the season Oxford City left the league after losing its ground. Walthamstow Avenue merged into Leytonstone/Ilford. New club regained Leytonstone/Ilford's name and place in the Premier Division.

Only Bracknell Town were reprieved from relegation, thus, Division One started next season one club short.

League table

Division Two North

Division Two North consisted of 22 clubs, including 19 clubs from the previous season and three new clubs:

 Finchley, relegated from Division One
 Tilbury, relegated from Division One
 Witham Town, joined from the Essex Senior League

Before the start of the next season Haringey Borough resigned from the league.

League table

Division Two South

Division Two South consisted of 22 clubs, including 19 clubs from the previous season and three new clubs:

 Epsom & Ewell, relegated from Division One
 Maidenhead United, relegated from Division One
 Yeading, joined from the London Spartan League

League table

See also
Isthmian League
1987–88 Northern Premier League
1987–88 Southern Football League

References

Isthmian League seasons
6